1995 in professional wrestling describes the year's events in the world of professional wrestling.

List of notable promotions 
These promotions held notable shows in 1995.

Calendar of notable shows

January

February

March

April

May

June

July

August

September

October

November

December

Notable events
 May 14 – The first WWF in Your House two hour PPV debuts in Syracuse, NY with a Sid Vicious vs WWF World Heavyweight Champion "Big Daddy Cool" Diesel main event.
 September 4  WCW Monday Nitro debut on TNT and with it the official start of the Monday Night War
 The Universal Wrestling Association closed.
 November 9 – WCW Pro debut their first episode from the Disney/MGM Studios in their custom arena.
 November 26 – SMW closed their doors after their final live event in Cookeville, Tennessee wrapping up the SMW vs USWA feud.

Accomplishments and tournaments

WCW

WCW Hall of Fame

WWF

WWF Hall of Fame

Awards and honors

Pro Wrestling Illustrated

Wrestling Observer Newsletter

Title changes

ECW

FMW

NJPW

WCW

WWF

Births
 April 1 – Logan Paul
 June 9
 Tony D'Angelo
 Tay Melo
 August 19 – The Velveteen Dream
 August 29 – Rey Celestial (died in 2017)
 October 16 – Fuego Del Sol
 October 28 – Mansoor (wrestler)

Debuts
Uncertain debut date
 Chyna
 January 8 – Yuki Miyazaki
 June – Christian
 October 13 – Kuuga

Retirements
 Lord Alfred Hayes (1950s–1995)
 Animal Hamaguchi (1969–1995)
 Archie Gouldie (November 2, 1962 – September 2, 1995)
 Baron von Raschke (1966–1995)
 Bryant Anderson (1993–1995)
 Dan Spivey (1983–October 1995)
 Gordon Solie (1950s–1995)
 Jack Tunney (September 2, 1984 – July 12, 1995)
 Jim Crockett, Sr. (1973–1994)
 John Tatum (1983–1995)
 Jorge Gonzalez (May 19, 1990 – December 8, 1995)
 Jos LeDuc (1968–1995)
 Junkyard Dog (1976–1995)
 Kevin Von Erich (1976–1995)
 Lou Albano (1953–1995)
 Pez Whatley (1973–1998)
 The Sheik (wrestler) (1947-1995, did not announce his retirement until 1998) 
 El Supremo (1976–1995)
 Toni Adams (1985–1995)

Deaths 
 January 22 – Jerry Blackwell, 45
 February 18 – Eddie Gilbert, 33
 March 20 – Big John Studd, 47
 April 11 - Harry Pennington (wrestler), 92
 May 10 - Ilio DiPaolo, 68
 August 24 – Killer Karl Krupp, 61
 October 2 – John Ayers, 42
 December 4 – Little Beaver, 60
 December 20 - Benny Ramírez, 63

See also
List of WCW pay-per-view events
List of WWF pay-per-view events
List of ECW supercards and pay-per-view events
List of FMW supercards and pay-per-view events

References

 
professional wrestling